Filipino Korean or Korean Filipino may refer to:
 State-to-state relations between the Philippines and North or South Korea; see:
 Foreign relations of North Korea
 Foreign relations of South Korea
 Foreign relations of the Philippines
Koreans in the Philippines
Filipinos in North Korea
Filipinos in South Korea
Multiracial people of mixed Filipino and Korean descent:
Kopino
Kosian, a more general term covering people of Korean and other Asian descent